Hoylake is a seaside town in Wirral, Merseyside, England.  It contains 41 buildings that are recorded in the National Heritage List for England as designated listed buildings.   Of these, two are listed at Grade II*, the middle of the three grades, and the others are at Grade II, the lowest grade.  The list includes listed buildings in the town of Hoylake, and in the surrounding villages and areas of West Kirby, Caldy, Frankby, Meols, Grange, and Hilbre Island.  In the list are houses and churches with associated structures, a telegraph station, a well house, a lighthouse, a village hall, banks, a drinking fountain, a war memorial, and a railway station.

Key

Buildings

References

Citations

Sources

Listed buildings in Merseyside
Lists of listed buildings in Merseyside